Function Drinks is a Functional Beverage company based in Los Angeles, California. The company was founded in 2004 by spine surgeon Dr. Alex Hughes, along with Josh Simon and Dayton Miller. The team launched their first product, Urban Detox, in Southern California in 2005.

In January 2008, Function Drinks was named the "Overall Best New Product" and "Best Functional Beverage" of 2007 by BevNET. Function is distributed nationally in Whole Foods, Target, and other retail chains.

Functional Platforms

Function: ALTERNATIVE ENERGY
 Functionality: sustained released energy, typically lasts 1 to 2 hours
 Flavor: Citrus Yuzu (Replacing Tangerine Yuzu), Strawberry Guava
 Key ingredients: Muira puama, Epimedium, Catuaba, and Yerba mate

Function: BRAINIAC
 Functionality: Improve brain function
 Flavor: Carambola Punch
 Key ingredients: N-Acetyle-Cysteine, Vitamin E as Mixed tocopherols, Zinc Picolinate, Soy phosphatidylserine, Ginkgo biloba.

Function: LIGHT WEIGHT
 Functionality: Boosts metabolism, curbs cravings for sugar and other carbohydrates
 Flavors: Açai Pomegranate, Blueberry Raspberry, Peach Mango
 Key ingredients: EGCG, Resveratrol, and Gymnema.

Function: URBAN DETOX
 Functionality: Recovery from hangovers; clears particulate pollution from lungs and sinuses
 Flavors: Citrus Prickly Pear and Goji Berry
 Key ingredients: N-Acetyle-Cysteine, Prickly Pear Fruit Extract, B vitamins (riboflavin or vitamin B), vitamins B and B, folate.

Function: WATER
 Electrolyte-enhanced, vapor distilled water

Advocates

Function has developed a strong following in the Hollywood community, with fans ranging from Madonna, Shakira, Tobey Maguire, Lauren Conrad, Keanu Reeves, Kelly Slater, celebrity trainer Tracy Anderson, and pro snowboarder Jake Blauvelt.

References

External links
2008 article about the company in New York Magazine

Energy drinks
Food and drink companies established in 2004